Syed Jafar Imam was an Indian politician who served as a Member of Parliament, Rajya Sabha, representing Bihar, as a member of the Indian National Congress. He hailed from Neora, Bihar.

References

Rajya Sabha members from Bihar
Indian National Congress politicians
1903 births
Year of death missing